The 2011–12 Czech 2. Liga is the 19th season of the Czech Second Division, the second tier of the Czech football league. The season began on 5 August 2011 and concluded on 26 May 2012. The winter break commenced after 19 November 2011 and the league restarted on 10 March 2012.

FK Ústí nad Labem secured promotion to the Czech First League on 12 May 2012. However, due to their stadium, which did not comply with league regulations, Ústí were not granted a license to play in the following season's Czech First League. The promotion place therefore went to fourth-placed Brno.

Team changes

From 2. Liga
Promoted to Czech First League
 FK Dukla Prague
 FK Viktoria Žižkov

Relegated to Moravian-Silesian Football League
 FC Hlučín

Relegated to Bohemian Football League
 SK Kladno

To 2. Liga
Opava returned to the Czech Second Division after a one-season absence, winning promotion from the MSFL at the first attempt.

Relegated from Czech First League
 FC Zbrojovka Brno
 FK Ústí nad Labem

Promoted from Bohemian Football League
 FK Bohemians Prague (Střížkov)

Promoted from Moravian-Silesian Football League
 SFC Opava

Team overview

Notes:
 Sparta B does not have a home stadium, for the 2011–12 season Sparta B are ground-sharing at Stadion SC Horní Počernice.

League table

Results

Top goalscorers

See also
 2011–12 Czech First League
 2011–12 Czech Cup

References

Czech 2. Liga seasons
Czech
2011–12 in Czech football